Emma MacLaren was born 13 February 1991 in Worcester, UK. At 13 years of age Emma began her modelling career after she was scouted by Europe's leading modelling agency, Models1 in 2004. At the age of 18 she became a face of Max Factor and in 2009, she signed a fragrance contract with Burberry Brit. Emma was soon published on the pages of Spanish, Russian and German Vogue, Glamour Italia,  Elle  UK and Denmark. She has also been featured on the cover of L'Officiel. Since 2013 she has mostly retired from modelling.
Throughout her career Emma continued to pursue her passion for music. She is a classically trained soprano singer, songwriter and also has a keen interest in fitness and nutrition.

Early life
MacLaren was born in Worcester, and grew up in the Worcestershire countryside. Prior to becoming a model, MacLaren was pursuing a career in music and theatre and she continues to follow this path. Emma is a classically trained soprano singer and songwriter, as well as a profession in fitness and nutrition.

Career
MacLaren began in the modelling industry when she was scouted at the annual Clothes Show Live fashion event in Birmingham UK, in 2004. Emma made her catwalk debut in February 2008 in London for Ashley Isham and Allegra Hicks. September 2009 was her breakthrough season, where she appeared at the fashion weeks in New York, London, Milan and Paris. She walked for designers such as Donna Karan, Marc Jacobs, Pringle of Scotland, Akris, Christian Dior, Sonia Rykiel and Paul Smith, among many others.

Soon after she appeared in advertising campaigns for brands such as Moschino Cheap & Chic, Bottega Veneta, Burberry and Marks and Spencer Per Una. In late 2009, MacLaren signed a contract with Burberry Brit fragrance, shot by photographer David Sims.

Emma has appeared in editorials for Exit, Elle, French, Harper's Bazaar, Interview, Italian Marie Claire, L'Officiel, Vanity Fair, Velvet, Russian, Spanish and German Vogue and has appeared on the covers of L'Officiel, Italian Marie Claire, Eurowoman and ELLE Denmark.

References

External links 
 PONY RYDER interview
 i-Profile: Emma Maclaren (August 21, 2011)
 FTAPE: Emma Maclaren
 
 Emma Maclaren at Vogue Italia

Living people
English female models
1991 births
People from Worcester, England